Moggs Creek is an Australian coastal hamlet on the Great Ocean Road between Aireys Inlet and Lorne. In the 2021 census, Moggs Creek had a population of 120 people.

The settlement is located on a sandy coastal strip, backed by wooded hills, in which the creek itself rises, running about 10 km south-east to the ocean. The origin of the name Moggs is uncertain, the creek having also been known as the McLaren and Bell Bird in the past. Local belief is that Moggs derives from a family of graziers near St Arnaud, who used to bring cattle to graze in the area.

The construction of the Great Ocean Road in the 1920s paved the way for further development, but it was only after World War II that land in the area was subdivided and sold for housing.

In 1959, a group of Moggs Creek residents erected a rough cairn of bricks, topped by a plaster bust, as a monument to the mythical Sir Samuel Moggs, alleged to be the first European to have landed at the location, on 29 February 1759.

Notable people 

 Patrick Dangerfield, AFL footballer playing for the Geelong Football Club, and formerly the Adelaide Football Club

References 

Armstrong, Paul. Victoria: a Lonely Planet Australia guide. Lonely Planet Publications, 1996
Everist, Richard. The Complete Guide to the Great Ocean Road. BestShot, 2009
Moggs Creek Tide Times and Heights
"Moggs Creek Postcode (VIC)". QPZM Postcodes Australia.

Towns in Victoria (Australia)
Great Ocean Road